Anna-Carin Ahlquist (born 5 June 1972) is a Swedish in wheelchair table tennis player and paralympic champion. Ahlquist represented Sweden at the 2008, 2012, 2016 Summer Paralympics, and 2020 Summer Paralympics.

She won a gold medal in single and a silver medal in team at the 2012 Summer Paralympics. She also won a bronze medal in single at the 2016 Summer Paralympics behind double gold medallist Xue Juan and Li Qian.

She won a silver medal in Team C4–5, at the 2020 Summer Paralympics.

References 

1972 births
Swedish female table tennis players
Table tennis players at the 2008 Summer Paralympics
Table tennis players at the 2012 Summer Paralympics
Table tennis players at the 2016 Summer Paralympics
Table tennis players at the 2020 Summer Paralympics
Paralympic table tennis players of Sweden
Medalists at the 2012 Summer Paralympics
Medalists at the 2016 Summer Paralympics
Medalists at the 2020 Summer Paralympics
Paralympic medalists in table tennis
Paralympic gold medalists for Sweden
Paralympic silver medalists for Sweden
Paralympic bronze medalists for Sweden
Living people
21st-century Swedish women